Super Hits is a compilation album by country music artist Kenny Chesney. It was released on November 15, 2007 as part of Sony BMG's Super Hits series.

Commercial performance
Super Hits peaked at number 52 on the US Billboard Top Country Albums chart the week of March 28, 2009.

Track listing

Charts

Weekly charts

References

External links
[ Super Hits] at Allmusic

2007 greatest hits albums
Kenny Chesney albums